Southern Command is a 1981 video game published by Strategic Simulations for the Apple II.

Gameplay
Southern Command is a game in which the player plays as the Israelis during the Yom Kippur War.

Reception
Bob Proctor reviewed the game for Computer Gaming World, and stated that "Southern Command is an outstanding game and a very realistic historical simulation. The rule book and two reference cards are of SSI's usual (high) quality. The only thing I could want would be an option to play the Egyptian side solitaire, but programming the computer to play the Israelis would not be a trivial task. Still, it will keep me busy trying to crack that Egyptian defense at the highest difficulty level. I urge you to try it too."

References

External links
1984 Software Encyclopedia from Electronic Games
Review in Electronic Games

1981 video games
Apple II games
Apple II-only games
Computer wargames
Mass media about the Arab–Israeli conflict
Strategic Simulations games
Turn-based strategy video games
Video games developed in the United States
Video games set in 1973
Video games set in Israel